Diphu Government College, established in the year 1964, is a general degree college situated at Diphu, Karbi Anglong, Assam. This college is affiliated with the Assam University. This college offers different courses in Arts, Commerce and Science.

Motto
The motto of the college “Ano Bhadrah Kratavyo Yantu Vishwatah” is a Sanskrit verse taken from the Rig Veda. The meaning of the verse/motto is “Let noble thoughts come to us from every side”. The Motto was adopted by Prof. Udai Bhanu Pandey, former Principal of the college.

Emblem
The Emblem was drawn by Lt. Basanta Das

Departments
The college has 15 departments. These are - 
 Assamese
 Bodo
Botany
Chemistry 
Commerce
Economics
Education
 English
Geography 
History
Mathematics
Philosophy
Physics
Political Science 
Zoology

See also
 Assam University

References

External links
 Diphu Government College along Disaster Management aphuthak seke kipi
 

Universities and colleges in Assam
Karbi Anglong district
Colleges affiliated to Assam University
1964 establishments in Assam
Educational institutions established in 1964